The Leap in the Dark (German:Der Sprung ins Dunkle) is a 1920 German silent mystery film directed by and starring Ernst Reicher as the detective character Stuart Webbs, part of a long-running series of silent films.

Cast
 Lia Eibenschütz 
 Stella Harf 
 Ernst Reicher as Detective Stuart Webbs

References

Bibliography
 Rainey, Buck. Serials and Series: A World Filmography, 1912-1956. McFarland, 2015.

External links

1920 films
Films of the Weimar Republic
German silent feature films
German mystery films
German black-and-white films
1920 mystery films
Silent mystery films
1920s German films
1920s German-language films